Metsänpeitto (lit. forest's cover) is a place or a phenomenon found in Finnish folklore. It is used to describe people or domestic animals who went missing in nature for unexplained reasons.

People "covered by forest" were described as not being able to recognize the terrain around them, even if they were on familiar grounds. In other cases they might have walked endlessly through unfamiliar terrain, or were rendered completely paralyzed, unable to move or speak. Unnatural silence devoid of the sounds of nature was also common.

People or animals under the influence of the phenomenon were described as becoming either completely invisible to other people, or looking like part of the nature around them, like a rock. In one story a man had been looking for a missing cow for days. When he finally gave up and returned to his work, the first tree stump he struck with his axe transformed back into his cow.

The cause behind metsänpeitto was usually credited to maahinens, who were small humanoid creatures living underground (usually translated as "gnomes"). Some people managed to free themselves from metsänpeitto by their own means, for example by turning their jacket inside out, by switching their shoes to the wrong feet, or by watching world upside down through their own legs. This was because of the idea that everything was topsy-turvy in the lands of the maahinens. Some were released seemingly without reason, others only after being sought after by a shaman. Some were never seen again.

One could save cattle from Metsänpeitto with a spell originating in the town of Kuhmo, asking the forest to let them return.

Metsänpeitto greatly resembles "kamikakushi", or "spiriting away", found in Japanese folklore.

References

Finnish mythology